Poltava Oblast (also referred to as Poltavshchyna – , literally 'Poltava Country') is an oblast (province) of central Ukraine. The administrative center of the oblast is the city of Poltava. Most of its territory is part of the historic Cossack Hetmanate (its southern regions: Poltava, Myrhorod, Lubny, and Hadiach). Population: 

Two other important cities there are Horishni Plavni and Kremenchuk.

History

During the 2022 Russian Invasion of Ukraine, the town of Myrhorod was bombed. However as of April 2022, there has been no ground fighting and the province remains completely under Ukrainian control.

Geography

Poltava Oblast is situated in the central part of Ukraine. Located on the left bank of Dnieper, Poltava region was part of the Cossack Hetmanate. It has an area of 28,800 km2. The oblast borders upon Chernihiv, Sumy, Kharkiv, Dnipropetrovsk, Kirovohrad, Cherkasy and Kyiv Oblasts.

Points of interest
The following historic-cultural sites were nominated for the Seven Wonders of Ukraine.
Gogol preserve-museum
Kotliarevsky villa
Mykolaivska Church
Poltava ethnical museum
Monastery of the Erection of the Cross

Demographics

, its population was 1,400,000 and population density was 49 people per 1 km2.

Age structure
 0–14 years: 13.2%  (male 99,444/female 93,949)
 15–64 years: 69.9%  (male 483,389/female 530,911)
 65 years and over: 16.9%  (male 81,435/female 164,861) (2013 official)

Median age
 total: 41.4 years 
 male: 38.0 years 
 female: 44.7 years  (2013 official)

Economy

Industry

The oblast is a center of Ukraine's oil and natural gas industry, with many wells and pipelines situated here. There is a major oil refinery plant in the city of Kremenchuk. Important iron ore processing facilities also present. In general, there are 374 large industrial organization and 618 small industrial organizations.

Agriculture

In 1999 the gross grain yield was about 14,529 thousand tons, sugar beets – 1,002,900 tons, sunflower seeds – 166,200 tons, potatoes – 279,900 tons. The oblast also produced 120,500 tons of meat, 645,900 tons of milk and 423,200,00 eggs. At the beginning of 1999 there were 1,311 registered farms in the region.

Administrative divisions

The oblast is divided into 25 districts, 5 cities, 21 urban villages, and 1862 villages.

The following data incorporates the number of each type of administrative divisions of the Poltava Oblast’:

Administrative Center – 1 (Poltava)
Raions – 25;
City raions – 5;
Settlements – 1526, including:
Villages – 1,831;
Cities/Towns – 35, including:
Urban-type settlement – 21;
Cities – 15, including:
Cities of oblast' subordinance – 5;
Cities of raion subordinance – 8;
Rural councils – 384.

The local administration of the oblast' is controlled by the Poltava Oblast Rada. The governor of the oblast’ is the Poltava Oblast’ Rada speaker, appointed by the President of Ukraine.

Note: Asterisks (*) Though the administrative center of the rayon is housed in the city/town that it is named after, cities do not answer to the rayon authorities only towns do; instead they are directly subordinated to the oblast government and therefore are not counted as part of rayon statistics.

Nomenclature

Most of Ukraine's oblasts are named after their capital cities, officially referred to as "oblast centers" (translit. oblasnyi tsentr). The name of each oblast is a relative adjective, formed by adding a feminine suffix to the name of respective center city: Poltava is the center of the Poltavs’ka oblast’ (Poltava Oblast). Most oblasts are also sometimes referred to in a feminine noun form, following the convention of traditional regional place names, ending with the suffix "-shchyna", as is the case with the Poltava Oblast, Poltavshchyna.

References

External links
 
State Administration of Poltava Region – official site  
Information Card of the Region – official site of the Cabinet of Ministers of Ukraine

 
Oblasts of Ukraine
States and territories established in 1937
1937 establishments in Ukraine